Kansas Crew is the co-ed college rowing club for the University of Kansas in Lawrence, Kansas. The club is located on a 5,000 meter stretch of the Kansas River. Kansas Crew was established in 1977. 
 
The team is coached by Dan Jewett. Notable alumni of the team include national team rowers Rob Zechmann, David Gabel, and Jenn Jewett. The team shares facilities with the University of Kansas women's Division I rowing team at Burcham Park in Lawrence, Kansas.

References

External links
 

Rowing clubs in the United States
University of Kansas
1977 establishments in Kansas
Sports clubs established in 1977